Riquewihr is a commune in the Haut-Rhin department in Grand Est in north-eastern France.

A popular tourist attraction for its historical architecture, Riquewihr is also known for the Riesling and other wines produced in the village. Riquewihr looks today more or less as it did in the 16th century. It is located on the Route des Vins (The Wines Road), close to Colmar.

Geography

History
Originally the property of the Dukes of Württemberg, the town was converted to Protestantism in the 16th century. Historically, Riquewihr served as a Winzerdorf or "wine village" as a trading hub for Alsatian and German wine.

Sights
Riquewihr was one of the few towns in the area not to be badly damaged during World War II. The town is surrounded by its medieval fortifications and is overlooked by a castle from the same period that is today a museum.

There is a museum about Alsace during World War II and a torture chamber (La salle de torture).

The village is a member of the Les Plus Beaux Villages de France ("The most beautiful villages of France") association.

People 
 Karoline Herder (1750-1809), German editor

See also
 Communes of the Haut-Rhin department

References

External links

 Official website of the municipality, in French
 Tourism office website
 Tour in Riquewihr (Spanish)

Communes of Haut-Rhin
Plus Beaux Villages de France